Pobladura de Pelayo García is a municipality located in the province of León, Castile and León, Spain. According to the 2005 census (INE), the municipality had a population of 521 inhabitants.

References

Municipalities in the Province of León